Top Ground Gear Force is a one-off TV special, featuring the presenters of BBC's Top Gear, which originally aired on BBC Two at 22:00 GMT on 14 March 2008 as part of Sport Relief 2008. It was repeated on Easter Monday, 2008.
 
It borrowed its format from Top Gear of the Pops, a similar one-off special which aired as part of Comic Relief 2007.  Whereas Top Gear of The Pops combined Top Gear with Top of the Pops, this episode combines the motoring show with Ground Force, a gardening makeover show which ran on the BBC from 1998 to 2005.

Regular Top Gear hosts Jeremy Clarkson, James May and Richard Hammond take over sportsman Steve Redgrave's garden, to dispense advice on creating a zero maintenance lawn, installing an impressive water feature and getting rid of unwanted plants.  Naturally, disaster ensues. Top Ground Gear Force was then included as a page in the 2009 Big Book of Top Gear, giving advice to garden problems including concreting the garden over, petrol bombs and flash fires.

Title screen
Like Top Gear of the Pops, the title screen and music is changed to suit the programme. Instead of having cars in the background, images of gardening were shown instead. The images bore a strong resemblance to the Top Gear title screen (e.g. dirt coming out of a spinning pot, similar to a car wheel spinning and kicking up water from the ground) Hammond was seen pushing a spade into the ground, and then holding it over his shoulder. May was seen holding a wheelbarrow, and breaking a gnome in half (in replacement of him pushing a button on a remote control in the Top Gear title screen). Clarkson was seen with a pair of open hedge trimmers, which he then snaps shut.

Ending credits
The Top Gear ending credits are also adapted to suit the programme's resemblance to Ground Force – the presenters' names were listed as Alan Clarkson, Handy Hammond and Charlie May (references to Ground Force presenters Alan Titchmarsh, Tommy Walsh and Charlie Dimmock respectively). The rest of the crew were all listed as having the first name "Monty". This 'mocking' was also used in special editions such as the Top Gear Polar Special, in which the presenters' first names were changed to 'Sir Ranulph', as a reference to Sir Ranulph Fiennes.

Title irregularities
The title Top Ground Gear Force appears during the opening credits and is spoken by the hosts throughout the show. However, the insulated jackets worn by the three hosts are silkscreened with "TGGGF" on the front chest and "Top Garden Ground Gear Force" on the rear. Other equipment, such as a flatbed truck, is labeled with the factual title, "Top Ground Gear Force". This minor detail is not explained throughout the show and may be a simple mistake or an intentional joke. In his book, And on That Bombshell, Richard Porter (Top Gears script editor) explained that the original name was in fact "Top Garden Gear Ground Force" but the word "garden" was removed since it is not found in either show's title.

Synopsis

The Top Gear team of Jeremy Clarkson, James May and Richard Hammond decided, for Sport Relief, to impersonate and belittle the show Ground Force, and provide a garden makeover to the garden of one of Britain's sporting legends, namely Steve Redgrave. Helping them was a team of "Foreign Nationals", and on hand to provide advice on Redgrave's tastes was his wife, Ann Redgrave, who was erroneously addressed and referred to as "Lady Ann" rather than the proper "Lady Redgrave".

As the team's only 'country bumpkin', Hammond decided to designate himself as the team leader. However, his plan to build a 'river of gravel' failed to impress Clarkson and May, who wanted to include a water feature and a shed, respectively. Clarkson also noted that Hammond's river of gravel would pass through one of Redgrave's flowerbeds, which would be particularly difficult to remove. Hammond demonstrates that it is easy to simply dig up each flower with a trowel, Clarkson declares it would take too long, and instead reveals his unique method for removing the flowers using a shotgun. Unimpressed, Hammond sends Clarkson and May to a Garden Centre to pick up supplies.

Deciding to go ahead with his plans to create a 'river of gravel', Hammond uses a small Caterpillar digger to dig a trench in the garden. Meanwhile, Clarkson and May arrive back with their desired equipment, only to destroy the push bike of one of Redgrave's children as they pull into his drive. Clarkson enlists the Poles to start work on his greenhouse, as May starts work on his shed, by organizing his tools and parts meticulously and slowly. Clarkson, impatiently, reminds May of the time pressure and demands him to properly start building the shed, followed by a time-lapse of May ignoring this advice. Clarkson shoots May's tape measure shortly thereafter. Then, as Clarkson explains both his new water feature and the arrival of a generator to power his new "Ferrari Enzo of pumps" for the water feature to the camera, Hammond immobilizes his digger by crashing it into the trench. So, he hires a new, much larger, and much heavier digger to pull the smaller one out of the hole. However, it simply results in a ruined and lacerated lawn with a multitude of caterpillar track marks left all over it. Everything is then interrupted by the arrival of a concrete truck Clarkson has summoned in order to pave the entire lawn. Yet, despite his estimations, he orders too little, and only a small portion of the lawn is covered, throwing away any hope the worst of the ruined lawn can be hidden. At this point in time though, construction on May's shed was going quite nicely.

Next on display was Hammond's round-the-tree seat to be placed at the end of his 'river of gravel'. However, Clarkson quickly points out that despite the seat being complete, Hammond has no way of placing it around the tree, as it has been constructed as a sole piece. Clarkson offers to help Hammond by attempting to prune the tree with his shotgun, allowing the seat to be lifted and then dropped from the top of the tree. However, his gun misfires and/or he misses, and instead blasts a hole through the window, then side, of May's shed. Meanwhile, Hammond brings out at 14-ton crane to lift his seat high enough to slip it over the tree. He proceeds to get stuck in the lawn instead, his crane leaving massive craters in the lawn due to its weight. Realizing the boom of the crane is still long enough to do the job, he attempts to lift the seat and place it around the tree. His attempt fails when his ineptitude of crane operation causes him to swing the boom (and seat) around in a circle instead of lifting it. This results in the demolition of May's shed, and he's furious despite Clarkson's laughter. Therefore, in 5 hours, the team have successfully dug a minute trench, crashed a digger, knocked over a shed, concreted half the lawn, ruined the other half with caterpillar tracks, broken a seat, shot some flowers, and set a Pole on fire. However, the greenhouse is going along well, and May's shed is quickly reinstated. May now begins to trace an outline of each tool hanging in the shed (to know where they ought to go when they need to be put back), alphabetically order and tidy the books on the bookshelf, and hang pictures that he believes will remind Redgrave of his glory days. Meanwhile, Clarkson has the tricky job of removing a rockery in order to build his water feature. His explanation of his decision for using a homemade bomb to finish the job quickly and easily is made more difficult with the arrival of the Salvation Army Brass Band drowning his voice out. Ultimately, the bomb is successful, destroying the rockery in one clean sweep—and all of the windows and one of the walls of May's rebuilt shed, leaving him completely livid. After May is informed the programme was going to air after the watershed, he exclaims at Clarkson, 'you're a fuc-'; at which point, the episode cuts to the next scene.

With the Salvation Army Brass Band marching behind him, Clarkson arrives to see Hammond stuck in the undried concrete. With conversation made impossible by the music behind them, Clarkson makes the band shut up with the bending of a trombone. After the insanity of the preceding events, Clarkson moves on to his next project—erecting some rugby posts, despite being told that none of Redgrave's family plays rugby. With May having successfully rebuilt his shed again, it's not long before Clarkson and the Poles lose grip on the rugby posts, and destroy part of the shed again. By this point, a fuming James May is brandishing a stick, screaming at Clarkson to apologize and to admit that he is in fact not the smartest person to ever exist, to put it in politer terms. Hammond, then, has moved on to his last project, a turbo-charged barbecue system, which allows the user to cook varieties of meat in under five minutes, using a jet engine to rotate the meat and cook it. Clarkson and May are incredulous, then impressed until the blades begin to rotate too fast, and the chicken is flung off the rotisserie. May and Clarkson are amused as all of Hammond's projects so far - the tree seat, river of gravel and barbecue - have all failed, while both May's shed, after being resurrected three times, and Clarkson's greenhouse, have both been successful. However, amusement does not last long, as his shed is set on fire by the out-of-control barbecue/jet engine. An enraged and frantic James May attempts to put the fire out before it can take hold, but he is unable to grab hold of the fire extinguisher which Clarkson now holds.

In the midst of this latest calamity, the team suddenly receives word that Redgrave is now pulling into the drive. Despite two abandoned Caterpillar diggers, an abandoned crane, a burning shed, a ruined lawn and a destructive barbecue, the team are forced to go ahead and unveil the garden to Redgrave. Redgrave is absolutely furious at the state of his garden, and storms inside his house, leaving the Poles to run away, with Clarkson proclaiming they can 'sense the mood'. Clarkson and May initially attempt to blame the entire debacle on Hammond, but eventually, after Clarkson talking to him privately, Redgrave's mood lightens. Despite all of Hammond and May's projects being failures, Clarkson manages to unveil his proudly built greenhouse and his turbo-charged water feature. Redgrave is slightly impressed until Clarkson activates the water feature. The gush of water is so powerful that it manages to blast the top of the water feature off, sending gallons of water flying up into the air, and the broken half of the water feature crashing down through the greenhouse, smashing all of the windows and destroying some of the wooden structure.

Ratings
On its first showing in the UK on BBC Two, the programme obtained 4.5 million viewers which equated to a 22% audience share for its timeslot between 10pm and 10.40pm. The programme was part of the Sport Relief fundraising evening. The Sport Relief programmes preceding it on BBC One between 7pm and 10pm averaged 6.2 million viewers (28% audience share) and the Sport Relief programmes on BBC One between 10.50pm and 1am averaged 2.6 million viewers (29% audience share).

References

External links
 

Group Gear Force, Top
2008 British television series debuts
BBC Television shows
Gardening in the United Kingdom
Comic Relief